Elizabeth Alice MacGraw (born April 1, 1939) is an American actress and activist. She gained attention with her role in the film Goodbye, Columbus (1969), for which she won the Golden Globe Award for Most Promising Newcomer. She gained an international profile for her role in the film Love Story (1970), for which she was nominated for an Academy Award for Best Actress and won the Golden Globe Award for Best Actress in a Motion Picture – Drama. In 1972, MacGraw was voted the top female box office star in the world and was honored with a hands and footprints ceremony at Grauman's Chinese Theatre after having been in just three films. Despite this, she would retain her leading woman status in only four films afterward.  She went on to star in the popular action film The Getaway (1972). She played the female lead in Convoy (1978) and headlined the romantic sports drama Players (1979), the comedy Just Tell Me What You Want (1980), and appeared in the historical novel-based television miniseries The Winds of War (1983). In 1991, she published an autobiography, Moving Pictures.

Early life
MacGraw was born in Pound Ridge, New York, the daughter of commercial artists Frances (née Klein) and Richard MacGraw. She has one brother, Dick, an artist. Her mother was Jewish, the daughter of emigrants from Budapest, Hungary. MacGraw's mother chose not to disclose her ancestry to her father, instead professing ignorance about it. "I think Daddy was bigoted," MacGraw has said.

Her mother was considered a "pioneer" as an artist, who had taught in Paris before settling in Greenwich Village. Her parents married when her mother was nearing 35: "My gorgeous father: a combination of Tyrone Power and a mystery, a brilliant artist and a brain beyond brains." He was born in New Jersey with his childhood spent in an orphanage. He ran away to sea when he was 16 and studied art in Munich. MacGraw adds, "Daddy was frightened and really, really angry. He never forgave his real parents for giving him up." As an adult, he constantly suppressed the rage he built up against his parents. She described her father as "violent".

MacGraw attended Rosemary Hall in Greenwich, Connecticut and Wellesley College in Wellesley, Massachusetts.

Career

Early career
Beginning in 1960, MacGraw spent six years working at Harper's Bazaar magazine as a photographic assistant to fashion maven Diana Vreeland. She worked at Vogue magazine as a fashion model, and as a photographer's stylist. She has also worked as an interior decorator.

Film and television

MacGraw began her acting career in television commercials, including one for the Polaroid Swinger camera. In one commercial for International Paper, she was on a beach in a bikini made of Confil and went for a swim underwater to prove its strength and durability.  MacGraw gained attention in the film Goodbye, Columbus (1969), but real stardom came when she starred opposite Ryan O'Neal in Love Story (1970), one of the highest-grossing films in U.S. history. MacGraw was nominated for the Academy Award for Best Actress for that performance. Following Love Story, MacGraw was celebrated on the cover of Time magazine.

In 1972, after appearing in just three films, she had her footprints and autograph engraved at Grauman's Chinese Theatre. She then starred opposite Steve McQueen in The Getaway (1972), which was one of the year's top ten films at the box office. Having taken a five-year break from acting, in 1978 MacGraw re-emerged in another box office hit, Convoy (1978), opposite Kris Kristofferson. She then appeared in the films Players (1979) and Just Tell Me What You Want (1980), directed by Sidney Lumet.

In 1983, MacGraw starred in the highly successful television miniseries The Winds of War. In 1985, MacGraw joined hit ABC prime-time soap opera Dynasty as Lady Ashley Mitchell, which, she admitted in a 2011 interview, she did for the money. She appeared in 14 episodes of the show before her character was killed off in the "Moldavian Massacre" cliffhanger episode in 1985.

She also hosted segments for the Encore Love Stories premium cable network in the late 1990s and 2000s.

In February 2021, MacGraw and O'Neal were honored with stars on the Hollywood Walk of Fame, nearly 50 years after the release of Love Story.

Stage
MacGraw made her Broadway theatre debut in New York City in 2006 as a dysfunctional matriarch in the drama Festen (The Celebration).

In 2016, MacGraw reunited with Ryan O'Neal in a staging of A.R. Gurney's play Love Letters, which toured the US and UK through 2017.

Magazine recognition
In 1991, People magazine selected MacGraw as one of its "50 Most Beautiful People" in the World.

In 2008, GQ magazine listed her in their "Sexiest 25 Women in Film Ever" edition.

Yoga
Having become a Hatha Yoga devotee in her early 50s, MacGraw produced a yoga video with the American Yoga Master Erich Schiffmann, Ali MacGraw Yoga Mind and Body. The impact of this bestselling video was such that in June 2007, Vanity Fair magazine credited MacGraw with being one of the people responsible for the practice's recent popularity in the United States.

Animal welfare
In July 2006, MacGraw filmed a public service announcement for People for the Ethical Treatment of Animals (PETA), urging residents to take their pets with them in the event of wildfires. In 2008, she wrote the foreword to the book Pawprints of Katrina by author Cathy Scott and photography by Clay Myers about Best Friends Animal Society and the largest pet rescue in U.S. history. MacGraw is also a U.S. Ambassador for animal welfare charity Animals Asia. An animal rights advocate throughout her life, she received the Humane Education Award by Animal Protection of New Mexico for speaking out about animal issues.

Personal life
While in college, MacGraw met German Canadian Robert "Robin" Martin Hoen, a Harvard-educated banker, and the couple married on October 29, 1960. They divorced a year and a half later. Hoen died on September 13, 2016.

Following her first divorce, MacGraw had a string of relationships and one abortion; the procedure was still illegal at the time. In 1979, MacGraw's mother, who was 38 when she had her, revealed that she had an abortion of her own in the early 1920s.

On October 24, 1969, MacGraw married film producer Robert Evans. Their son, Josh Evans, is an actor, director, producer and screenwriter. They separated in 1972 after she became involved in a public affair with Steve McQueen on the set of The Getaway. She married McQueen on July 12, 1973, in Cheyenne, Wyoming, and divorced him in August 1978.

Since her divorce from McQueen, she  has dated Warren Beatty, Rick Danko, Bill Hudson, Ronald Meyer, Rod Stryker, Fran Tarkenton, Peter Weller, Henry Wolf and Mickey Raphael.

MacGraw's autobiography, Moving Pictures, revealed her struggles with alcohol and sex addiction. She was treated for the former at the Betty Ford Center.

When former husband Evans received his star on the Hollywood Walk of Fame in 2002, she accompanied him. Their grandson Jackson was born in December 2010 to Josh and his wife, singer Roxy Saint. After Evans's 2019 death, MacGraw told The Hollywood Reporter, "Our son, Joshua, and I will miss Bob tremendously, and we are so very proud of his enormous contribution to the film industry." Evans told Vanity Fair in 2010 that during the last four decades of his life, MacGraw had been a good friend to him.

MacGraw has lived in Tesuque, New Mexico, since 1994, after the house she rented in Malibu was destroyed by a fire. MacGraw was originally intended to make a cameo as herself in the Breaking Bad episode "Grey Matter" as a guest at the birthday party of character Elliott Schwartz, set in Santa Fe, but her appearance did not make the final cut of the episode.

Filmography

Films

Television

Explanatory footnotes

Citations

General sources 
 
 Artists Direct biography
 People magazine interview, February 14, 1983

External links

 
 

1939 births
Living people
20th-century American actresses
21st-century American actresses
20th-century American women writers
Actresses from New York (state)
American film actresses
American television actresses
American people of Hungarian-Jewish descent
Jewish American actresses
Best Drama Actress Golden Globe (film) winners
New Star of the Year (Actress) Golden Globe winners
David di Donatello winners
Writers from New York (state)
Writers from Santa Fe, New Mexico
American autobiographers
Women autobiographers
American female models
Choate Rosemary Hall alumni
Wellesley College alumni
Actors from Santa Fe, New Mexico
People from Pound Ridge, New York
People from Tesuque, New Mexico
American women non-fiction writers
20th-century American non-fiction writers
Evans family (Paramount Pictures)
21st-century American Jews